The Noel J Taylor Memorial Mile is a Group One race for pacing horses in New Zealand. 

It is currently held over the distance of 1609 metres (one mile) once a year at Alexandra Park, Auckland, New Zealand. From 2007 to 2018 it was raced over 1700m.

Traditionally the race was only for 4 year old pacers.  However, from 2013 to 2015 the race was also open to five-year-olds. For the 2022 event it was opened up to all pacers.  As well as being a major event in its own right, it is also the key lead-up to the New Zealand Messenger run the following week.

Winners list

Other major races

 Auckland Trotting Cup
 New Zealand Trotting Cup
 New Zealand Free For All
 Great Northern Derby
 Dominion Handicap
 Rowe Cup
 New Zealand Messenger
 Inter Dominion Pacing Championship
 Inter Dominion Trotting Championship
 Miracle Mile Pace

See also
 Harness racing
 Harness racing in New Zealand

References

Horse races in New Zealand
Harness racing in New Zealand